Víctor Omar Mañón Barrón (born 6 February 1992) is a Mexican professional footballer who plays as a forward for Liga Nacional club Achuapa.

Club career

CF Pachuca
With his debut in September 2007, he became the youngest footballer ever to play in a Mexican Primera División match, when his club beat Cruz Azul 2–1 in the seventh round of the league. On January 5, 2008, this honor passed to Martín Galván from Cruz Azul.

Mañón scored his first goal with Club Pachuca in a match against Jaguares de Chiapas on a Saturday, 5 September 2009.

International career
He has played for the under-17 national team. He made three appearances in the 2009 CONCACAF U17 Championship and scored a goal.

Honours
Pachuca
Mexican Primera División: Clausura 2007
CONCACAF Champions' Cup: 2007, 2008, 2009–2010

Loros UdeC
Serie A de México: Clausura 2018, 2018–2019

Tepatitlán
Liga de Expansión MX: Guardianes 2021
Campeón de Campeones: 2021

References

External links
 
 
 
 

Living people
1992 births
People from Celaya
Footballers from Guanajuato
Mexican footballers
Association football forwards
C.F. Pachuca players
Indios de Ciudad Juárez footballers
C.D. Veracruz footballers
Club Celaya footballers
Tlaxcala F.C. players
Alebrijes de Oaxaca players
Loros UdeC footballers
Mineros de Zacatecas players
Liga MX players
Ascenso MX players
Mexico youth international footballers
FC Juárez footballers
Liga Premier de México players